Astronomy Class are an Australian hip-hop / reggae group from Sydney. The group comprises Ozi Batla (Shannon Kennedy), Sir Robbo (Shane Roberts) and Chasm (Chris Hamer-Smith).

Kennedy is a member of The Herd, whilst Roberts is a member of Frigid and prog, downtempo and Krautrock band Tooth.

Biography
The group formed when Kennedy decided to collaborate with producers Roberts and Hamer-Smith in 2006.
"The original concept for Chasm and I was to do a production album, with various MCs and singers," Roberts says. "We'd both worked separately with Batla in the past, he was our main MC, so we gave him the beats [first]. He was really taken with them and expressed a desire to have them all for himself. That was how it started."

The resulting album, Exit Strategy was released in September 2006 and was selected by Triple J as its first feature album for 2007. The album features guests such as Lotek, Hau from Koolism, Urthboy, Ben Ezra (ESL), Gina Mitchell (Fbi's Basslines), DJ Skoob (NSW DMC Champ), 2Buck, Murda1, Lotek and BVA (Mnemonic Ascent), as well as Jane Tyrell (The Herd). Tracks from the album such as "A Bright Tomorrow", "Done The Sums" and "Rewind The Tape" all receiving airplay on Triple J and community radio stations across Australia. On the back of the album release Astronomy Class undertook a national tour covering five states and seventeen destinations over three months.

When asked how the name of the band came about, Kennedy advised (in an interview with Scene Magazine):
"A theme started to emerge that kind of had an astral flavour. There’s a bit of a history in hip hop and also reggae of doing astral/space themes. As I kept writing, there was sort of a narrative coming out about that same theme going on – it just started to stick after a while."

This notion was confirmed in a recent interview with Music Feeds where Ozi Batla discusses his love of sci-fi and related subject matter.

Astronomy Class were the sole support artists for Lily Allen's Brisbane and Sydney tour dates in 2007.

Marking the International Year of Astronomy, Astronomy Class released their second album, Pursuit of Happiness, on 2 May 2009. The album features guest vocals by Vida-Sunshyne, The Tongue, Diafrix, Kween G (KillaQueenz), and Ash Grunwald. The group toured nationally in support of the release between May and June 2009.

Discography

Albums

Awards and nominations

ARIA Music Awards
The ARIA Music Awards is an annual awards ceremony that recognises excellence, innovation, and achievement across all genres of Australian music. They commenced in 1987.

! 
|-
| 2014
| Mekong Delta Sunrise
| ARIA Award for Best World Music Album
| 
| 
|-

References

External links
Official webpage
Elefant Traks Artist profile
Myspace Page
AMO artist profile

Australian hip hop groups
New South Wales musical groups